Chincoteague is an impact crater in the Cebrenia quadrangle of Mars, located at 41.5° N and 236.0° W. It was named after Chincoteague, a town in Virginia, US. Chincoteague crater has a small central mound. Along the wall, a number of gullies are visible.

Gullies

Chincoteague crater displays gullies on its wall. Many ideas have been put forth to explain them. For many years, many researchers thought they were made by recent liquid water. However, with more observations, other mechanisms became possible. It was observed that new gullies were forming today during the Martian spring when dry ice was able to sublimate (turn from a solid to a gas). Chunks of dry ice could accumulate in the cold winter months and then slide down when warmed. In the thin atmosphere of the planet they would ride on a cushion of gas that was coming off the pieces of dry ice.

See also 
 List of craters on Mars

References 

Impact craters on Mars
Cebrenia quadrangle